Rani railway station(रानी रेलवे स्टेशन)is a main railway station in Pali district, Rajasthan. Its code is RANI. It serves Rani town. The station consists of two platforms. The platforms are not fully well sheltered. Many facilities including ticket vending machine and sanitation. Rani station equipped with 20 kW solar power supply. Rani Railway station is a part of Delhi–Mumbai Dedicated Freight Corridor. Construction had already begun and completed within few years and will be electrified too.

Major trains

Some of the important trains that runs from Rani are :
 19412/19411 Intercity Express
 19402/19401 Lucknow–Ahmedabad–Lucknow Weekly Express
 19416/19415 Shri Mata Vaishno Devi Katra–Ahmedabad–Shri Mata Vaishno Devi Katra Express
 54803/54804 Jodhpur–Ahmedabad–Jodhpur Passenger
 54806/54805 Jaipur–Ahmedabad–Jaipur Passenger
 19708/19707 Amarapur Aravali Express
 18422/18421 Ajmer–Puri–Ajmer Bi-Weekly Express
 14707/14708 Ranakpur Express
 12479/12480 Suryanagari Superfast Express
 19032/19031 Yoga Express
 16588/16587 Bikaner–Yashvantpur–Bikaner Express
 12990/12989 Ajmer–Dadar-Ajmer Superfast Express
 22950/22949 Delhi Sarai Rohilla–Bandra Terminus-Delhi Sarai Rohilla Superfast Express
 22932/22931 Jaisalmer–Bandra Terminus-–Jaisalmer Superfast Express
 22916/22915 Hisar–Bandra Terminus–Hisar Weekly Superfast Express

References

Railway stations in Pali district
Ajmer railway division